William Floyd Chadwick (1881 – 1936) was an English footballer who played in goal for Burslem Port Vale at the start of the 20th century.

Career
Chadwick played for Hanley Swifts, before joining Burslem Port Vale in May 1901 as back-up to Harry Cotton. His goalkeeping debut came in a 3–3 draw at Doncaster Rovers on 7 September 1901, and he played a further five Second Division games in 1901–02. He played two league games in the 1902–03 and 1903–04 campaigns, before he was released from the Athletic Ground in the summer of 1904.

Career statistics
Source:

References

1881 births
1936 deaths
Sportspeople from Hanley, Staffordshire
English footballers
Association football goalkeepers
Port Vale F.C. players
English Football League players